Lowell William Ross (March 13, 1932 – September 1, 2022) was an American politician. He served as a member of the South Carolina House of Representatives.

Life and career 
Ross was born in Oconee County, South Carolina. He attended Walhalla High School and the University of South Carolina. He served in the United States Air Force.

Ross served two separate terms in the South Carolina House of Representatives.

Ross died in September 2022, at the age of 90.

References 

1932 births
2022 deaths
People from Oconee County, South Carolina
Members of the South Carolina House of Representatives
20th-century American politicians
University of South Carolina alumni